John Stoke may refer to:
John Stoke (doctor) (1928–2000), New Zealand physician
John Stoke (MP) (died 1383), English politician, Mayor of Bristol
 John Stoke (died 1370), vicar commemorated at St. Mary's Church, Hadlow
 John Stoke (died 1451), Abbot of St Albans
 John Stoke, 1446 MP for Wallingford, see Wallingford

See also
John Stokes (disambiguation)